Francis Allen Bennett (October 27, 1904 – March 18, 1966), nicknamed "Chip", was a pitcher in Major League Baseball who played for the Boston Red Sox. Listed at  5' 10.5", 163 lb., he batted and threw right-handed.

A native of Mardela Springs, Maryland, Bennett reached the majors in 1927 with the Red Sox, spending part of two seasons with them. In five appearances, he posted a 0–1 record with a 2.70 ERA, including one start, one strikeout, six walks, and 13 ⅓ innings pitched.

Bennett died in Wilmington, Delaware, at the age of 61.

See also
Boston Red Sox all-time roster

External links

Retrosheet

Boston Red Sox players
Major League Baseball pitchers
Baseball players from Maryland
1904 births
1966 deaths
People from Wicomico County, Maryland
New Bedford Millmen players